Makane Ninakku Vendi is a 1971 Indian Malayalam-language film, directed by E. N. Balakrishnan. The film stars Prem Nazir, Sheela, Kaviyoor Ponnamma and Adoor Bhasi. The film had musical score by G. Devarajan.

Cast

Prem Nazir as Sam, Thomachan (double role)
Sheela as Chinnamma
Kaviyoor Ponnamma as Thomachan's mother
Adoor Bhasi as Kuruvilla Ashaan
Thikkurissy Sukumaran Nair as Mammachan
Prema as Saramma
T. S. Muthaiah as Peelippochan
Aarathi as Sophia
Khadeeja as Kalyani
Kottarakkara Sreedharan Nair as Mathachan
Philomina as Achamma
Ushanandini as Mary
TR Omana as Eali
Meena as Martha
Jose Prakash as Pappachan
Nellikode Bhaskaran as Chandikunju
Sreelatha Namboothiri as Mariakutty
Shobha as Young Sophia

Soundtrack
The music was composed by G. Devarajan and the lyrics were written by Vayalar Ramavarma.

References

External links
 

1971 films
1970s Malayalam-language films